Thurles is a town in North Tipperary.

Thurles may also refer to:

Places
Thurles (civil parish), which includes the town
Thurles (Roman Catholic parish), which also includes the town but is larger than the civil parish
Thurles Townparks, a townland in the civil parish which contains the older part of Thurles town
Thurles (poor law union), a large area (195 square miles) which was named after the town because its workhouse was located on the latter's north-western edge
Thurles Racecourse, a racecourse near Thurles town which stages horse racing

Clubs and Societies
Thurles Golf Club

Other
Viscount Thurles, a title in the Irish peerage
Elizabeth, Lady Thurles (1587–1673)